Acrocercops tacita is a moth of the family Gracillariidae. It is known from Greece (including the Peloponnisos and Rhodes) and Lebanon.

The larvae feed on Quercus coccifera. They mine the leaves of their host plant. The mine has the form of a blotch mine on the underside of the leaf.

References

tacita
Moths of Europe
Moths described in 2001